Martin Patrick Grainge Leonard DSO was an Anglican suffragan bishop from 1953 until his death.

Leonard was born at Torpenhow, near Cockermouth, Cumberland, on 5 July 1889.  He was educated at Rossall, Fleetwood, Lancashire and Oriel College, Oxford before embarking on an ecclesiastical career including service as a World War I chaplain.  Afterward, Leonard occupied a similar post at Cheltenham College.  He spent 14 years with the Toc H organisation.  Leonard subsequently became Rector of Hatfield, Rural Dean of Hertford, and Provost of St Mary's Cathedral, Glasgow. He was a Bishop of Thetford, and a lifelong supporter of the Boy Scout movement.

He died on 21 July 1963.

References

Works
"A book of Prayers and Hymns Selected for Scouts"; London; C. A. Pearson; 1933.

1889 births
1963 deaths
People from Cockermouth
People educated at Rossall School
Alumni of Oriel College, Oxford
King's Own Royal Regiment officers
Companions of the Distinguished Service Order
Provosts of St Mary's Cathedral, Glasgow
Bishops of Thetford
20th-century Church of England bishops
World War I chaplains
Royal Army Chaplains' Department officers